Helmut Lang (born 14 August 1940) is an Austrian sprinter. He competed in the men's 4 × 100 metres relay at the 1972 Summer Olympics.

References

1940 births
Living people
Athletes (track and field) at the 1972 Summer Olympics
Austrian male sprinters
Olympic athletes of Austria
Athletes from Vienna